Midwinter is the middle of the winter.

Midwinter may also refer to:
 Midwinter (surname)
 Midwinter (album), a 2001 album by Terry McDade and the McDades
 Midwinter (novel), a 1923 novel by John Buchan
 Midwinter (video game), a 1989 video game designed by Mike Singleton
 Midwinter Day, or Midwinter, a celebration held in Antarctica
 Midwinter Pottery, founded 1910 in Burslem, Stoke-on-Trent, UK

See also
 Yule
 James Midwinter Freeman (1827–1900), American clergyman and writer
 California Midwinter International Exposition of 1894, a World's Fair in San Francisco's Golden Gate Park
 Midsummer (disambiguation)
 Midvinterblot (disambiguation)
 Winter solstice (disambiguation)
 Winter (disambiguation)